The 2019 Waratah Cup was the 17th season of Football NSW's knockout competition. The Preliminary Rounds are now a part of the FFA Cup competition. 
The 5 winners from the FFA Cup preliminary Seventh Round qualified for the Waratah Cup.

The Cup was won by Marconi Stallions, their 2nd title.

Format

Preliminary rounds

New South Wales clubs, other than Northern NSW and A-League clubs, participate in the 2019 FFA Cup via the preliminary rounds. The competition is for all Senior Men's teams of the National Premier Leagues NSW, NPL 2, NPL 3, NSW State League, as well as Association teams which applied to participate.

A total of 144 clubs entered into the competition, including 96 grassroots clubs and the five qualifiers were:

Elimination playoff

Semi finals

Grand final

References

Waratah Cup
Waratah Cup